Gregory S. Harris (born 1965) is the president of the Rock and Roll Hall of Fame. Harris has worked at the Rock and Roll Hall of Fame since 2008, starting out as vice president of development and being named President and CEO in late 2012 and starting in the position in 2013. Prior to that a senior executive at the National Baseball Hall of Fame and Museum for fourteen years. Harris co-founded the Philadelphia Record Exchange in 1985 with Jacy Webster, a notable retail outlet which specialized in hard-to-find vinyl. He also worked in the live music business as the road manager for Ben Vaughn.

Harris has expended programming at the HOF, partnering with more traditional museums such as New York City's Metropolitan Museum of Art in 2019 to create a gigantic collection of musical instruments and photographs to accompany them. During COVID-19, the HOF expanded its educational outreach and put more of its programming on YouTube where they were able to reach hundreds of teachers daily. Harris has also been instrumental in an upcoming expansion of the HOF, a project that will break ground in 2022.

Harris was born West Trenton, New Jersey. His family moved to Morrisville, Pennsylvania when he was ten years old.  He graduated from Temple University with a B.A. in history in 1989, and earned a Master’s in history and museum studies from the Cooperstown Graduate Program at SUNY Oneonta.

References

1965 births
Living people
Rock and Roll Hall of Fame
People from Ewing Township, New Jersey
People from Morrisville, Pennsylvania
Temple University alumni
State University of New York at Oneonta alumni